Albert Holmes (born 14 February 1942) is an English footballer who played as a full back in the Football League with Chesterfield between 1961–62 and 1975–76.

He was a fitter with the East Midlands Gas Board, and played football for them before signing semi-pro for Chesterfield in 1960, and became a full professional the following year. He went on to make a total of 514 senior appearances for the club (scoring 10 goals). Of these, 470 were League appearances, putting him, in fourth position on the all-time league appearance list for Chesterfield.

After leaving Chesterfield he moved to Boston United. His son Paul was also a professional footballer.

References 

1942 births
Living people
Footballers from Sheffield
English footballers
Association football defenders
Chesterfield F.C. players
Boston United F.C. players
English Football League players
People from Ecclesfield